Black Lodge Records is a Swedish record label headquartered in Stockholm, Sweden. Black Lodge was formed in 2002, and exclusively focuses on the metal genre. The label spans a wide selection of Swedish and European metal artists, but is best known for launching the careers of bands like Sabaton, In Flames, and Twilight Force.

Distribution
Black Lodge Records has been owned by Sound Pollution Distribution, a Swedish record distribution company, since its formation in 2002.

Roster

Current
Abramis Brama
Ages
Beyond the Katakomb
Death Breath
Defecto
Eternal of Sweden
Hellfueled
Insania
Maze of Torment
Mean Streak
Merciless
Nale
Raise Hell
Rutthna
Sterbhaus
Stillborn
The Storyteller

Past
8th Sin
Abruptum
Amorphis
Bullet
Candlemass
Construcdead
Dissection
Eleine
Elvira Madigan
Enforcer
Eternal Oath
Face Down
Faceshift
Harms Way
Hysterica
In Flames
Katatonia
Månegarm
Marduk
Mörk Gryning
Netherbird
Sabaton
Serpent Obscene
The Kristet Utseende
Twilight Force
Tyranex

See also
 List of record labels

References

External links
 Official website

Swedish record labels
Heavy metal record labels
Black metal record labels